Philotheca gardneri is a species of flowering plant in the family Rutaceae and is endemic to the south-west of Western Australia. It is a shrub with crowded, narrow club-shaped or more or less spherical leaves and white flowers with a prominent pink midrib, usually borne singly on the ends of branchlets.

Description
The ten hairy stamens are free from each other. Flowering occurs from April to October.

Taxonomy and naming
This philotheca was first formally described in 1970 by Paul Wilson who gave it the name Eriostemon gardneri and published the description in the journal Nuytsia from specimens collected by Charles Gardner near  Jerramungup in 1939. In 1998, Wilson changed the name to Philotheca gardneri in the same journal and described two subspecies:
Philotheca gardneri  (A.Cunn. ex Endl.)

The specific epithet (gardneri) honours the collector of the type specimens, Charles Gardner and globosa refers to the shape of the leaves.

Distribution and habitat
Subspecies gardneri grows in mallee and heath between Wagin, Howick Hill and Bruce Rock in the Coolgardie, Esperance Plains and Mallee biogeographic regions. Subspecies globosa grows in heath in a small area between Ravensthorpe and Norseman.

Conservation status
Subspecies gardneri is classified as "not threatened" but subspecies globosa is listed as "Priority One" by the Government of Western Australia Department of Parks and Wildlife, meaning that it is known from only one or a few locations which are potentially at risk.

References

gardneri
Flora of Western Australia
Sapindales of Australia
Plants described in 1970
Taxa named by Paul G. Wilson